Parliamentarians for Nuclear Non-Proliferation and Disarmament (PNND) is a global network of over 700 parliamentarians from more than 75 countries working to prevent nuclear proliferation. Membership is open to current members of legislatures and parliaments at state, federal, national and regional levels.

The 2014 PNND Assembly was held in Washington, DC with the theme " Climbing the Mountain" IN JORDAN
Number of current members: 14
Number of alumni (former) members: 1

Location of PNND Assemblies
2012 - Astana, Kazakhstan
2014 - Washington, DC

See also
Anti-nuclear movement
Anti-nuclear organizations
Alyn Ware

References

Anti–nuclear weapons movement
Nuclear weapons policy